Belgrade Township may refer to the following townships in the United States:

 Belgrade Township, Nicollet County, Minnesota
 Belgrade Township, Washington County, Missouri

See also
 Belgrade (disambiguation)

Township name disambiguation pages